Tomonari Kanomata  (born August 4, 1979) is a Japanese mixed martial artist. He competed in the featherweight and lightweight divisions.

Mixed martial arts record

|-
| Loss
| align=center| 20-9-7
| Guy Delumeau
| Decision (Unanimous)
| Pancrase: 260
| 
| align=center| 3
| align=center| 5:00
| Tokyo, Japan
| 
|-
| Draw
| align=center| 20-8-7
| Junpei Chikano
| Draw (Majority)
| Pancrase: 257
| 
| align=center| 2
| align=center| 5:00
| Yokohama, Kanagawa, Japan
| 
|-
| Win
| align=center| 20-8-6
| Kazushi Sugiyama
| Decision (Unanimous)
| Pancrase: 255
| 
| align=center| 2
| align=center| 5:00
| Tokyo, Japan
| 
|-
| Loss
| align=center| 19-8-6
| Daniel Swain
| TKO (Punches)
| Pancrase: 248
| 
| align=center| 2
| align=center| 4:36
| Tokyo, Japan
| 
|-
| Loss
| align=center| 19-7-6
| Jon Shores
| Decision (Unanimous)
| Pancrase: Impressive Tour 13
| 
| align=center| 3
| align=center| 5:00
| Tokyo, Japan
| 
|-
| Loss
| align=center| 19-6-6
| Takumi Nakayama
| Decision (Unanimous)
| Pancrase: Impressive Tour 9
| 
| align=center| 3
| align=center| 5:00
| Tokyo, Japan
| 
|-
| Win
| align=center| 19-5-6
| Masakazu Takafuji
| Submission (Kimura)
| Pancrase: Impressive Tour 4
| 
| align=center| 1
| align=center| 4:08
| Tokyo, Japan
| 
|-
| Win
| align=center| 18-5-6
| Motoshi Miyaji
| Decision (Unanimous)
| Pancrase: Impressive Tour 1
| 
| align=center| 2
| align=center| 5:00
| Tokyo, Japan
| 
|-
| Win
| align=center| 17-5-6
| Kenji Arai
| Technical Submission (Rear-Naked Choke)
| Pancrase: Passion Tour 11
| 
| align=center| 1
| align=center| 0:24
| Tokyo, Japan
| 
|-
| Draw
| align=center| 16-5-6
| Shigeki Osawa
| Draw (Unanimous)
| Pancrase: Passion Tour 10
| 
| align=center| 3
| align=center| 5:00
| Tokyo, Japan
| 
|-
| Win
| align=center| 16-5-5
| Takayoshi Ono
| TKO (Punches)
| Pancrase: Passion Tour 7
| 
| align=center| 2
| align=center| 3:40
| Tokyo, Japan
| 
|-
| Loss
| align=center| 15-5-5
| Marlon Sandro
| KO (Punch)
| World Victory Road Presents: Sengoku Raiden Championships 12
| 
| align=center| 1
| align=center| 0:09
| Tokyo, Japan
| 
|-
| Win
| align=center| 15-4-5
| Shigeyuki Uchiyama
| Decision (Majority)
| Pancrase: Passion Tour 1
| 
| align=center| 2
| align=center| 5:00
| Tokyo, Japan
| 
|-
| Win
| align=center| 14-4-5
| Kenji Arai
| Decision (Unanimous)
| Pancrase: Changing Tour 8
| 
| align=center| 3
| align=center| 5:00
| Tokyo, Japan
| 
|-
| Draw
| align=center| 13-4-5
| Kenji Arai
| Draw (Majority)
| Pancrase: Changing Tour 6
| 
| align=center| 2
| align=center| 5:00
| Tokyo, Japan
| 
|-
| Draw
| align=center| 13-4-4
| Tashiro Nishiuchi
| Draw
| Pancrase: Changing Tour 4
| 
| align=center| 2
| align=center| 5:00
| Tokyo, Japan
| 
|-
| Loss
| align=center| 13-4-3
| Yoshihiro Koyama
| Decision (Unanimous)
| GCM: Cage Force EX
| 
| align=center| 3
| align=center| 5:00
| Tokorozawa, Saitama, Japan
| 
|-
| Win
| align=center| 13-3-3
| Eriya Matsuda
| Submission (Armbar)
| GCM: Cage Force 9
| 
| align=center| 1
| align=center| 0:30
| Tokyo, Japan
| 
|-
| Win
| align=center| 12-3-3
| Djamal Kurbanov
| Decision (Unanimous)
| FEFoMP: Mayor Cup 2008
| 
| align=center| 3
| align=center| 5:00
| Vladivostok, Primorsky Krai, Russia
| 
|-
| Loss
| align=center| 11-3-3
| Mizuto Hirota
| TKO (Punches)
| GCM: Cage Force 6
| 
| align=center| 1
| align=center| 1:00
| Tokyo, Japan
| 
|-
| Loss
| align=center| 11-2-3
| Artur Oumakhanov
| TKO (Cut)
| GCM: Cage Force EX Eastern Bound
| 
| align=center| 2
| align=center| 2:54
| 
| 
|-
| Win
| align=center| 11-1-3
| Wataru Takahashi
| Decision (Unanimous)
| GCM: Cage Force 3
| 
| align=center| 3
| align=center| 5:00
| Tokyo, Japan
| 
|-
| Win
| align=center| 10-1-3
| Jacob Sidic
| TKO (Punches)
| GCM: Cage Force 2
| 
| align=center| 1
| align=center| 0:09
| Tokyo, Japan
| 
|-
| Win
| align=center| 9-1-3
| Jarkko Latomaki
| Submission (Triangle Choke)
| CWFC: Showdown 2
| 
| align=center| 1
| align=center| 1:13
| Sheffield, Yorkshire and the Humber, England
| 
|-
| Win
| align=center| 8-1-3
| Peter Irving
| TKO (Punches)
| CWFC: Showdown 2
| 
| align=center| 2
| align=center| 3:36
| Sheffield, Yorkshire and the Humber, England
| 
|-
| Win
| align=center| 7-1-3
| Bryan Cohen
| TKO (Punches)
| CWFC: Showdown 2
| 
| align=center| 1
| align=center| 0:57
| Sheffield, Yorkshire and the Humber, England
| 
|-
| Win
| align=center| 6-1-3
| Yasunori Kanehara
| Decision (Majority)
| GCM: D.O.G. 7
| 
| align=center| 2
| align=center| 5:00
| Tokyo, Japan
| 
|-
| Win
| align=center| 5-1-3
| Yoichi Fukumoto
| Decision (Majority)
| GCM: D.O.G. 6
| 
| align=center| 3
| align=center| 5:00
| Tokyo, Japan
| 
|-
| Win
| align=center| 4-1-3
| Wataru Miki
| Decision (Unanimous)
| Shooto: 9/23 in Korakuen Hall
| 
| align=center| 2
| align=center| 5:00
| Tokyo, Japan
| 
|-
| Draw
| align=center| 3-1-3
| Kabuto Kokage
| Draw
| Shooto: Rookie Tournament 2004 Final
| 
| align=center| 2
| align=center| 5:00
| Setagaya, Tokyo, Japan
| 
|-
| Draw
| align=center| 3-1-2
| Ganjo Tentsuku
| Draw
| Shooto 2004: 7/4 in Kitazawa Town Hall
| 
| align=center| 2
| align=center| 5:00
| Setagaya, Tokyo, Japan
| 
|-
| Win
| align=center| 3-1-1
| Takayuki Okochi
| Decision (Unanimous)
| Shooto 2004: 5/3 in Korakuen Hall
| 
| align=center| 2
| align=center| 5:00
| Tokyo, Japan
| 
|-
| Loss
| align=center| 2-1-1
| Nobuhiro Obiya
| TKO (Punches)
| Shooto: Who is Young Leader!
| 
| align=center| 1
| align=center| 0:11
| Tokyo, Japan
| 
|-
| Win
| align=center| 2-0-1
| Masaya Takita
| Submission (Armbar)
| Shooto: 5/4 in Korakuen Hall
| 
| align=center| 1
| align=center| 4:49
| Tokyo, Japan
| 
|-
| Win
| align=center| 1-0-1
| Yoshinori Amari
| Submission (Armbar)
| Shooto: 1/24 in Korakuen Hall
| 
| align=center| 1
| align=center| 4:16
| Tokyo, Japan
| 
|-
| Draw
| align=center| 0-0-1
| Nobuhiro Obiya
| Draw
| Shooto: Treasure Hunt 11
| 
| align=center| 2
| align=center| 5:00
| Tokyo, Japan
|

See also
List of male mixed martial artists

References

External links
 

1979 births
Japanese male mixed martial artists
Featherweight mixed martial artists
Lightweight mixed martial artists
Mixed martial artists utilizing Brazilian jiu-jitsu
Japanese practitioners of Brazilian jiu-jitsu
People awarded a black belt in Brazilian jiu-jitsu
Living people